The 2014 Open de la Réunion was a professional tennis tournament played on hard courts. It was the second edition of the tournament which is part of the 2014 ATP Challenger Tour. It will take place in Saint-Denis, Réunion between 25 October and 2 November 2014.

Singles entrants

Seeds

1 Rankings are as of October 20, 2014

Other entrants
The following players received wildcards into the singles main draw:
  Maxime Teixeira
  Elie Rousset
  Pere Riba
  Grégoire Barrère

The following players received entry from the qualifying draw:
  Ugo Nastasi
  Gero Kretschmer
  Luca Margaroli
  Lionel Mansour

Champions

Singles

  Robin Haase def.  Florent Serra, 3–6, 6–1, 7–5

Doubles

  Robin Haase /  Mate Pavić def.  Jonathan Eysseric /  Fabrice Martin, 7–5, 4–6, [10–7]

External links
 ITF Search
 ATP official site
 Website

Open de la Reunion
2014 in Réunion
Hard court tennis tournaments
Tennis tournaments in France
Sport in Saint-Denis, Réunion
October 2014 sports events in Africa
November 2014 sports events in Africa
2014 in African sport
2014 in French tennis
Open de la Réunion